Wohlgeboren ("well-born") was a form of address for the lowest ranks of German nobility. The Latin version of this term is "spectabilis".

German usage
The actual address was (Euer) Wohlgeboren, it is the proper form of address for a Vogt or Büttel

Swedish usage
"Välborne" for untitled Swedish nobility and "högvälborne" for counts and barons.

Higher form of address
The title should not be confused with the following, in order of increasing rank:
- (Euer) Hochwohlgeboren (lit. highly well-born), the form of address for German barons (Freiherren), nobles (Edle) and knights (Ritter) ;
- (Euer) Hochgeboren (lit. high-born'''), the proper form of address for members of the titled German nobility, ranking just below the sovereign and mediatised dynasties;
- Erlaucht (Illustrious Highness), the correct address for those German immediate counts (Reichsgrafen) who are heirs of mediatised families of the Holy Roman Empire;
- Durchlaucht (Serene Highness), the correct address for German princes (Fürsten) and dukes (Herzog'').

References

Styles (forms of address)